Bouchercon is an annual convention of creators and devotees of mystery and detective fiction. It is named in honour of writer, reviewer, and editor Anthony Boucher; also the inspiration for the Anthony Awards, which have been issued at the convention since 1986. This page details Bouchercon XXXIX and the 23rd Anthony Awards ceremony.

Bouchercon
The convention was held in Baltimore, Maryland on October 9, 2008; running until the 12th. The event was chaired by Ruth Jordan, publisher and editor of Crimespree magazine, and Judy Bobalik, editor of the Reflections in a Private Eye magazine.

Special Guests
Lifetime Achievement awards — Robert Rosenwald & Barbara Peters
Distinguished Contribution to the Genre award — Lawrence Block
International Guest of Honor — John Harvey
American Guest of Honor — Laura Lippman
Toastmaster — Mark Billingham
Fan Guest of Honor — Thalia Proctor

Anthony Awards
The following list details the awards distributed at the twenty-third annual Anthony Awards ceremony.

Novel award
Winner:
Laura Lippman, What the Dead Know

Shortlist:
James Lee Burke, The Tin Roof Blowdown
Lee Child, Bad Luck and Trouble
Robert Crais, The Watchman
William Kent Krueger, Thunder Bay

First novel award
Winner:
Tana French, In the Woods

Shortlist:
Sean Chercover, Big City, Bad Blood
Lisa Lutz, The Spellman Files
Craig McDonald, Head Games
Marcus Sakey, The Blade Itself

Paperback original award
Winner:
P. J. Parrish, A Thousand Bones

Shortlist:
Megan Abbott, Queenpin
Ken Bruen & Jason Starr, Slide
David Corbett, Blood of Paradise
Robert Fate, Baby Shark's Beaumont Blues

Short story award
Winner:
Laura Lippman, "Hardly knew Her", from Dead Man's Hand: Crime Fiction at the Poker Table

Shortlist:
Rhys Bowen, "Please Watch Your Step", from The Strand Magazine February/May 2007
Steve Hockensmith, "Dear Dr. Watson", from Ellery Queen's Mystery Magazine February 2007
Toni L. P. Kelner, "How Stella Got Her Grave Back", from Many Bloody Returns: Tales of Birthdays with Bite
Daniel Woodrell, "Uncle", from A Hell of a Woman: An Anthology of Female Noir

Critical / Non-fiction award
Winner:
Jon Lellenberg, Daniel Stashower & Charles Foley, Arthur Conan Doyle: A Life in Letters

Shortlist:
Roger Sobin, The Essential Mystery Lists
Patrick Anderson, The Triumph of the Thriller: How Cops, Crooks and Cannibals Captured Popular Fiction
Christiana Gregoriou, Deviance in Contemporary Crime Fiction

Website award
Winner:
Stan Ulrich & Lucinda Surber, Stop, You're Killing Me!

Shortlist:
Sarah Weinman, Confessions of an Idiosyncratic Mind
J. Kingston Pierce, January Magazine (and The Rap Sheet)
Tess Gerritsen & J. T. Ellison et al., Murderati
David Montgomery, Crime Fiction Dossier

Special service award
Winner:
Jon Jordan and Ruth Jordan, Crimespree Magazine

Shortlist:
Ali Karim, Shots magazine
Maddy Van Hertbruggen, 4 Mystery Addicts
Sarah Weinman, Confessions of an Idiosyncratic Mind
Judy Bobalik, for being one of the best friends and supporters of mystery writers

References

Anthony Awards
39
2008 in Maryland